Diocese of Boston may refer to:
 Greek Orthodox Metropolis of Boston, an ecclesiastical territory of the Greek Orthodox Church
 Roman Catholic Archdiocese of Boston, an ecclesiastical Archdiocese of the Roman Catholic Church